The Huber Civil Engineering Research Prize (Huber Award) is the highest level mid-career research award in all areas of civil engineering. The award is annually given to individuals with notable achievements and contributions in research with respect to all disciplines of civil engineering. This award was first established by the American Society of Civil Engineers (ASCE) board of direction in 1946 and was given for the first time in 1949.

History 

Walter L. Huber (1883-1960) was an engineer, mountaineer, and conservationist. His research interests mostly were in the field of  structural, hydroelectric, and irrigation projects. He also made some studies in the field of  flood control, municipal water supplies, seismic forces and earthquake resistance.

The awards authorized for the first time as  annual awards by the ASCE board of direction to encourage research activities in civil engineering in July 1946. These prestigious annual awards endowed in honor of  Walter L. Huber, Past President of the ASCE, by his wife Alberta Reed Huber in 1964.

Award Condition 
Based on the rules of the award, "the nominees must either be under 40 years of age or have worked no more than 12 years since receiving their doctoral degree at the time of nomination, whichever is less restrictive". Huber awardees are "generally younger than 45 and have demonstrated a level of achievement and excellence that bodes well for a long and fruitful career."

Past recipients 
The following list is based on the information provided by the ASCE.

See also

 List of engineering awards

References 

Awards of the American Society of Civil Engineers